L. flavus  may refer to:
 Lasius flavus, the yellow meadow ant, an ant species mostly found in Central Europe
 Limax flavus, the yellow slug, an air-breathing land slug species

See also
 Flavus (disambiguation)